13 Semester is a 2009 German comedy film. The subtitle (caption) „Der frühe Vogel kann mich mal” (literatally “screw the early bird”) indicates that some students are not happy about the ‘early bird’. 13 semesters is longer than the standard period of study.

The film is about two friends, Moritz and Dirk, who move from a small village in the state of Brandenburg to Darmstadt to study mathematical economics at the Technische Universität (TU). The Movie was first shown at the Zurich Film Festival and was also shown at the Hof International Film Festival on 29 September 2009. It started running in German cinemas on 7 January 2010.

Plot
The friends Moritz and Dirk are accepted at the Technische Universität Darmstadt and leave their small home village in Brandenburg to set out for the big town to study mathematical economics. Having arrived, their lives change in completely different ways. While Dirk becomes a successful student and masters tutorials and term papers with ease, Moritz is distracted from his studies by the university lifestyle and soon falls behind.
Following the slogan “Screw the early bird” Moritz prefers to party with his roommate Bernd and gets himself through life with various side jobs. On one of Bernd's parties he meets Kerstin, the woman of his dreams, with whom he ends up in a relationship after some indirections.

Due to a lack of motivation he is thrown out of his and Dirk's study group. This fuels him with new ambition and together with his Indian fellow student Aswin, who lives his life in discipline, Moritz picks himself up and passes his intermediate diploma. In gratitude he shows Aswin the more enjoyable side of university life and takes him along to drink beer. This leads to Aswin's life taking a yet unexpected turning as well.
After his intermediate diploma Moritz spends a semester abroad in Australia. These scenes are expressed through multiple photo sequences that are commented by Moritz. The story he tells differs considerably according to whom he is talking to.

When he arrives back in Germany, he meets Kerstin in a laundromat and soon gets together with her. At first, the relationship is harmonic but soon the mood changes because Moritz is dissatisfied with himself and his life. This leads to Kerstin breaking up with him and Moritz moving out of the apartment he shared with Bernd.

At this event the movie takes a turning point. Moritz meets his old friend Dirk again, who is working in Frankfurt now. In a conversation with him, it becomes clear that while Dirk has always gone directly for the goal he is ultimately unsure whether this was the best way.  Moritz takes heart and decides to finally finish his studies. He takes off like a rocket and passes his diploma.
In the end, Moritz and Dirk are in Australia, where they lead a successful chain of restaurants for Maultaschen, a special German dish. However, the film only hints at what happens between Moritz and Kerstin, thus leaving the ending open.

Background
The main models for the film were experiences made by co-author Oliver Ziegenbalg. He studied mathematical economics and even achieved a diploma in his field of study. According to the director, there are more connections to real life that result from memories of his own life as a student.
Frieder Wittich got to know the band Bonaparte at a small concert in Berlin and spontaneously invited them to take part in the shooting of 13 Semester. Thus, the song “Anti, Anti” became the film's theme song. The band cancelled a concert for this film and specially wrote a new song that is played over the end credits.
At the beginning of the shooting, Amit Shah, who plays Aswin, could barely speak German. He figured it out himself while shooting.

Production
The shooting for 13 Semester took place in the city of Darmstadt from March, 31 to May 13 in 2008. Darmstadt, the fourth-biggest city in the state of Hessen, had won in a casting against Münster, Karlsruhe and Konstanz, among others. Among other places in the near surroundings, several facilities of the Technical University of Darmstadt (Technische Universität Darmstadt), the canteen of the Darmstadt University of Applied Sciences (Hochschule Darmstadt), the University- and state library, the students dormitory Karlshof as well as the bar of the Kammerspiele of the local state theater, the inner-city lake “Großer Woog”, the Herrngarrten, Frankfurt and Offenbach am Main served as setting.

Reception
Reviews of 13 Semester were mostly favourable: Kulthit.de praises the film as equivalent to the many US American student comedies. Filmszene.de highlights the character development, and kino.de talks about a successful Coming-of-Age comedy that very well depicts real students’ life, whereas Cinema thinks the film to be more “authentic” than funny and labels 13 Semester a tragic comedy.
“’13 Semester‘ is an entertaining and loveable German students‘ comedy. After some initial difficulties, director Wittich does not stick his foot in his mouth as often as could have been expected. It authentically, emphatically and humorously deals with really essential questions, such as “Why” and “Where to” in life and also gives differentiated answers. Here and there, it pleasantly makes fun of some cinematic stereotype which means that what is expected is not what happens.

Success
13 Semester had its debut performance on September, 29 in 2009 during the Zurich Film Festival. It had its first release in Germany on the Hof International Film Festival on October, 28 the same year. Finally, the official theatrical release was on January, 7 in 2010. In Germany, the film attracted 56,700 viewers on the first screening weekend and thereby got on place 7 of the cinema charts. Until March 2010 a total of 174,600 viewers watched the film. It made about 1,333,750 $ (1,068,950 €) at the box offices. The movie thereby in turn got on place 29 of the most successful German productions of 2010.

Cast

 Max Riemelt as Moritz (called “Momo”)
 Robert Gwisdek as his friend Dirk
 Dieter Mann as Professor Schäfer
 Amit Shah as Aswin
 Moritz Pliquet as Arne
 Daniel Zillmann as Käthe
 Cyril Sjöström as Flo
 Alex Holike as Jugendherbergsgast
 Benjamin Kramme as  Uwe
 Alexander Fehling as Bernd (flatmate of “Momo”)
 Claudia Eisinger as Kerstin

References

External links
 

German comedy films
2000s German-language films
2009 films
2000s German films